Vitis is a town in the district of Waidhofen an der Thaya in the Austrian state of Lower Austria.

Population

References

External links 

Cities and towns in Waidhofen an der Thaya District